Linn Township is one of eight townships in Audrain County, Missouri, United States. As of the 2010 census, its population was 615.

The origin of the name Linn Township is disputed.

Geography
It contains one cemetery, New Providence.

The streams of Bean Branch, Johns Branch and Mams Slough run through this township.

References

 USGS Geographic Names Information System (GNIS)

External links
 US-Counties.com
 City-Data.com

Townships in Audrain County, Missouri
Townships in Missouri